Marc VDS Racing Team is a motorcycle racing team founded by Belgian owner Marc-Oswald van der Straten-Ponthoz, descendant of the founder of the Stella Artois brewery. The team competes in motorcycle racing in the Moto2 World Championship under the name ELF Marc VDS Racing Team. The team has previously competed in the MotoGP and MotoE classes. It also previously competed in many auto racing championships, particularly in grand touring classes - namely the FIA GT1 World Championship, the Blancpain Endurance Series, and the European Le Mans Series - as well as the NASCAR Whelen Euro Series. They have also previously contested in rallying at various rally raid events, such as the Dakar Rally.

History

Mixed motorsport era

Based in Gosselies, Belgium, Marc VDS began competing in the Belcar series as part of the racing program for the Gillet Vertigo, a Belgian sports car, under the Belgian Racing title. By 2005 the Gillet program expanded to include the international FIA GT Championship, although the team was not allowed to compete for the season championship due to the low production of road legal Vertigos.  Despite continued development for several years, the Gillet program ended in 2008 and van der Straten rebranded the team as Marc VDS for the 2009 season. The team however remained involved in the FIA GT Championship at the behest of Jean Michel Delporte and Bas Leinders by becoming one of two development teams for the Matech Ford GT, shifting the team to the GT1 category.  Marc VDS also expanded their program through the purchase of a Volkswagen Buggy TDI Rally raid for the 2010 Dakar Rally.

After their year of development in FIA GT, Marc VDS was one of twelve teams granted entry in the inaugural FIA GT1 World Championship in 2010, where they would retain their Ford GT. The 2010 GT1 program also included an entry in the Le Mans Series' 1000 km of Spa as well as the 24 Hours of Le Mans.  Shortly after entering FIA GT1, Marc VDS also announced their merger with Michael Bartholemy and Didier de Radiguès' entry in the new Moto2 category of Grand Prix motorcycle racing, where riders Scott Redding and Héctor Faubel would compete on Suter bikes. Marc VDS also added a fourth program to 2010 by co-developing a Ford Mustang with Multimatic Motorsports of Canada for use in the FIA GT3 European Championship.

In 2013, Marc VDS had a good showing in Moto2, with their riders Scott Redding and Mika Kallio finishing 2nd and 4th in the championship. The team also expanded their motorcycle grand prix programme into the Moto3 category with Kalex-built and KTM-powered machinery with Belgian rider Livio Loi. This expansion proved a challenge, with Loi and Marc VDS barely managing to finish in the points in 4 out of 15 entered races that season. The troubles continued the following season, and despite a good 4th place finish at the third race in Argentina, Livio failed to place better than 19th in the following 6 races. Livio was ultimately replaced mid-season with Spanish rider Jorge Navarro for the remainder of the season. 2014 was, however, the first taste of major success for Marc VDS in the Moto2 class, where their riders Tito Rabat and Mika Kallio finished 1st and 2nd respectively in the rider's championship.

For 2015, Marc VDS dropped their difficult Moto3 programme, as they were presented with the opportunity to run a satellite Honda bike in the premier MotoGP class. Former long-time Marc VDS rider Scott Redding returned for this season. Redding and Marc VDS were reasonably successful from the off, consistently finishing in points-scoring positions and even achieving a 3rd place podium position in San Marino. The team finished a respectable 8th in the team's championship, significantly ahead of even some teams who regularly fielded two riders.

In July 2015, Bas Leinders announced he had parted from the team. In October 2015, Marc van der Straten announced that the sportscar racing programme would end at the conclusion of the 2015 season. He claimed he had lost confidence in his managers because they had taken too great a risk with his money. In addition, the SRO Motorsports Group, organizer of the Blancpain GT Series, introduced a new regulation for the 24 Hours of Spa which stated that pro teams must compete in all races of the series to be eligible for the 24 Hours. Van der Straten did not like this decision, as the team only wished to participate in the 24 Hours of Spa. Accordingly, the Marc VDS Racing Team decided to concentrate solely on two-wheeled motorsports.

Motorcycle Grand Prix era

In 2016, Marc VDS fielded two bikes in the MotoGP class, ridden by Australian Jack Miller and their former Moto2 champion Tito Rabat. Rabat was able to finish consistently in the points, but it was Jack Miller who gave the Marc VDS team their first taste of ultimate success at the pinnacle of motorcycle racing, by winning a rain-soaked Assen TT. The win was the first for a non-factory team in nearly a decade, dating back to the 2006 Portuguese GP.

2017 was another strong year for Marc VDS. In MotoGP, both riders continued with the team, and thanks to more consistent performances from both, Marc VDS finished 7th in the team's championship with 117 points, their best finish in the class to date. In the Moto2 class, rider Franco Morbidelli achieved 8 wins from 18 rounds, sealing another rider's championship for the team. Second rider Álex Márquez also managed three further wins, securing 4th place on the year.

For 2018, Morbidelli was promoted to the MotoGP squad alongside his Moto2 runner-up Thomas Lüthi. Morbidelli was able to consistently finish in the low point-scoring positions, thus being crowned rookie of the year, but Lüthi failed to score a single point that season. The team finished second-to-last in the team's championship in 11th. During the course of the season, team leader Bartholemy left the team by “mutual agreement”, according to a Marc VDS statement, after reports in German media claimed he had been embezzling team funds. As a result of this upheaval and a desire of the MotoGP commercial rights holder Dorna Sports to reduce grid sizes, Marc VDS was dropped from the MotoGP class at the end of 2018. In Moto2 the team finished 3rd in the team standings despite not earning a single win in the class, at the end of the season Joan Mir prematurely ended his three year contract with Marc VDS early to move up to the MotoGP class to take over the vacant Suzuki seat. 

In 2019, Marc VDS returned to winning ways in Moto2 with Álex Márquez taking 5 wins and 10 podiums en route to the rider's championship. Teammate Xavi Vierge's inconsistent results however relegated the team to just 4th place in the team's championship. The team also joined in the inaugural MotoE season with Mike Di Meglio taking pole, fastest lap, and the win at the Austrian round.

In 2020, the team achieved second place in the Moto2 teams' championship on the backs of riders Sam Lowes' and Augusto Fernández's performances (3 wins, 4 further podiums and 6 further top 5 finishes). It was the team's best result since the teams' championship was counted in Moto2. In MotoE, Di Miglio achieved two podium finishes and ended the season in fourth position overall.

2021 saw Marc VDS and rider Di Meglio elect to leave the MotoE class, citing scheduling conflicts with Di Meglio's Endurance World Championship commitments. The team continued in Moto2 with Lowes and Fernández, the former sweeping both races of the season-opening double header from pole in Qatar. With a further win in Emilia-Romagna and two further podium finishes from Lowes and six podium finishes from Fernández, Marc VDS again achieved second place in the teams' championship.

Motorsports results

By rider

Grand Prix motorcycle results
(key) (Races in bold indicate pole position; races in italics indicate fastest lap)

Rally Raid

FIA GT1 World Championship

Blancplain Endurance Series results

24 Hours of Le Mans

24 Hours of Nürburgring

Complete NASCAR Whelen Euro Series results
(key) (Bold – Pole position awarded by qualifying time. Italics – Pole position earned by points standings or practice time. * – Most laps led.)

References

External links

 
 

Belgian auto racing teams
Motorcycle racing teams
FIA GT Championship teams
FIA GT1 World Championship teams
European Le Mans Series teams
24 Hours of Le Mans teams
Blancpain Endurance Series teams
British GT Championship teams
NASCAR teams
Motorcycle racing teams established in 2009
Racecar constructors
Ford in motorsport